The name Castello Branco may refer to 

 Camilo Castelo Branco (1825–1890); Portuguese writer, publishing over 260 works in this time; committed suicide in 1890.
 Humberto de Alencar Castelo Branco (1900–1967); Brazilian marshal, involved in the 1964 coup d'état, and President of Brazil from 1964 to 1967.
 Rodovia Castelo Branco, a Brazilian highway named after him.